Ma Zhenxia (born 1 August 1998) is a Chinese racewalker. She won the gold medal in the girls' 5 kilometre walk at the 2014 Summer Youth Olympics held in Nanjing, China.

In 2015, she won the gold medal in the women's 5000 metres walk at the Asian Youth Athletics Championships held in Doha, Qatar. In the same year, she also won the gold medal in the women's 5000 metres walk at the 2015 World Youth Championships in Athletics held in Cali, Colombia.

She won the junior women's race at the 2016 IAAF World Race Walking Team Championships held in Rome, Italy. In the same year, she also won the gold medal in the women's 10,000 metres walk at the 2016 IAAF World U20 Championships held in Bydgoszcz, Poland.

She won the women's event at the 2019 Asian Race Walking Championships.

She competed in the women's 20 kilometres walk at the 2022 World Athletics Championships held in Eugene, Oregon, United States.

References

External links 
 

Living people
1998 births
Place of birth missing (living people)
Chinese female racewalkers
Athletes (track and field) at the 2014 Summer Youth Olympics
Youth Olympic gold medalists for China
Youth Olympic gold medalists in athletics (track and field)
21st-century Chinese women